Lingfield can refer to:

 Lingfield, County Durham, England, a village 
 Lingfield, Surrey, England, a village 
 Lingfield Park Racecourse
 Lingfield Cricket Club, prominent in the 18th century 
 Lingfield railway station, serving the village and racecourse
 Lingfield F.C., a football club in the village 
 Lingfield College, a school in the village 
 Lingfield Christian Academy, an independent school in Gweru, Zimbabwe

See also
 Lindfield (disambiguation)
 Linfield (disambiguation)